Stade Poitevin Poitiers is a French volleyball club from Poitiers and plays in the LNV Ligue A.

Club originally was founded in 1973 and reorganised in 2012 after compulsory liquidation.

Honours
Pro A
 Winner: 1999, 2011

Coupe de France
 Winner: 1996, 2002, 2014, 2020
 Finalist: 2003

See also
 France men's national volleyball team

External links
Official Website 
Team profile at Volleybox.net

French volleyball clubs
Volleyball clubs established in 1973
1973 establishments in France